María Luisa Penne Rullan de Castillo (11 September 1913 – 6 October 2005), born in Ponce, Puerto Rico, was a painter, artist, and educator who taught and influenced the work of well-known artists such as Noemí Ruiz, Jaime Carrero, Rafael Rivera Garcia, and printmaker Susanna Herrero among others.

Early life
Doña María Luisa was born in Ponce, Puerto Rico on September 11, 1913.

Education
Doña Maria Luisa attended the Pratt Institute in New York from 1932 to 1935 and became the first Puerto Rican to graduate from the prestigious art and design institute. She continued her studies, obtaining a Bachelor of Arts from the University of Puerto Rico in 1939 and a master's in Art from the Art Institute of Chicago in 1947. Her doctoral studies were conducted at Columbia University in New York.

After returning to Puerto Rico, Mrs. Castillo or "la teacher" - as she was known to her disciples - began to work for the empowerment of women in the art world, a field traditionally reserved for male members of society. She firmly believed in the importance of education as a means to achieve such empowerment. Therefore, she decided to get involved in the field of art education.

Penne Rullan designed and implemented the art curriculum for the Polytechnic Institute of San Germán (now known as the Inter-American University of Puerto Rico) and for the Colegio de Mayaguez also known as the University of Puerto Rico at Mayagüez. She was Head of the Department of Fine Arts at both institutions from 1940–1961 and 1961–1980, respectively.

Personal life
Penne Rullan married Don Francisco Castillo Amy and had two children.

Death
Penne died in San Juan, Puerto Rico in October 2005.

Disciples
Among Penne's students was Rafael Rivera Garcia.

Artist work and legacy

Some of her art work can be seen at the collection of the Institute of Puerto Rican Culture and at the Museum of Art of Puerto Rico.

Important expositions in her honor

Some collective expositions

See also
List of Puerto Ricans

References

External links
 https://web.archive.org/web/20100527102913/http://www.sagrado.edu/noticias/luisas.htm (BROKEN LINK)
 
 http://www.enciclopediapr1.org/ing/article.cfm?ref=06100227&page=5
 https://books.google.com/books?id=rP6p1n9jNb8C&pg=PA74&lpg=PA74&dq=Maria+Luisa+Penne&source=bl&ots=tR9W_tSRow&sig=7c46y3nPo88YHyIKZdr4HUch3tQ&hl=en&ei=iGkBTIDQN4OBlAevxZXMCQ&sa=X&oi=book_result&ct=result&resnum=7&ved=0CCsQ6AEwBjgK#v=onepage&q=Maria%20Luisa%20Penne&f=false
 https://books.google.com/books?id=1vsOMopLwp0C&pg=PA218&lpg=PA218&dq=Maria+Luisa+Penne&source=bl&ots=ESjnrV7ZEI&sig=lsdH2Ft9RL5FBO-mBAOPaBrsgXQ&hl=en&ei=m2kBTOqzO4KKlweAnsC9CQ&sa=X&oi=book_result&ct=result&resnum=5&ved=0CB8Q6AEwBDgU#v=onepage&q=Maria%20Luisa%20Penne&f=false
 http://www.mujeryempresas.org/cms/index.php/images/stories/videos/index.php?view=details&id=192%3Aexposicion-de-arte-qlas-tres-luisasq&option=com_eventlist&Itemid=15
 http://en.wordpress.com/tag/maria-luisa-penne-de-castillo/
 http://teresalopez.org/zepolt/puertorico2.html

1913 births
2005 deaths
Puerto Rican educators
Puerto Rican painters
Puerto Rican women painters
School of the Art Institute of Chicago alumni
Hispanic and Latino American women in the arts
Painters from Ponce
20th-century American painters
20th-century American women artists